J. Ernest Browning was a cattle rancher in Arizona during the 1900s.  He helped to organize the American Quarter Horse Association in 1940.  In 1982 he was awarded the National Livestock Association's "Golden Spur Award" for his contributions to the nation's livestock and ranching industries.  Also in 1942, he was inducted into the American Quarter Horse Hall of Fame.  He was also co-founder of the National Cowboy Hall of Fame. 

Browning was born in 1899 in Elk Canyon, New Mexico, and moved to Willcox, Arizona with his family in 1913.  During the 1940s and 1950s he acquired several ranches, the High Lonesome, the Schilling, and the Muleshoe, creating a single huge ranch.

In 1967, Browning was inducted into the Arizona Horsemen's Hall of Fame, and in 1991, along with Barry Goldwater, he was inducted into the National Cowboy Hall of Fame.

Browning died on November 19, 1984.

References

Ranchers from Arizona